This is a list of sailing ships of the Venetian Navy. From the Fifth Ottoman-Venetian War to the fall of the Republic of Venice in 1797, Venice maintained a good number of sailing warships, that formed the so-called Armada Grossa, opposed to the galley-based Armada Sottile. The vast majority of those ships were built in the Venetian Arsenal as some of its roofed shipbuilding docks were enlarged to allow construction of sailing vessels.

Ships of the Line

First-rate vessels
According to the classification used in the Venetian navy, those  ('first-rate') vessels comprised every two-decked ship armed with more than 62 guns. Usually, the ordnance varied from 68 to 74 guns, but the greatest part of those ships were 70-gun vessels. Since the second half of the 18th century and the appearance of the heavy frigates, the class comprised only ships with more than 68 guns, and those ships of the line were simply called "line vessels".

 , 4 ships, 1667-1709
 , 29 ships, 1691-1746
 , 1 ship, 1712-1728
 , 14 ships, 1716-1797
 , 2 ships, 1750-1797

Second-rate vessels
The  ('second-rate') Venetian ships of the line were two-deckers with an armament that varied from 48 to 66 guns. They served as support to the main battle line of primo rango vessels and as scouting ships. After the Peace of Passarowitz in 1718 and the decline of Venetian naval strength, their number was greatly reduced, and from the second half of the 18th century their roles were taken by newly built frigates.

 , 5 ships, 1673-1720 
 , 4 ships, 1676-1717 
 , 1 ship, 1684-1690 
, 3 ships, 1685-1752 
 , 4 ships, 1693-1748 
 , 6 ships, 1717-1738

Third-rate vessels
Those ships carried from 52 to 40 guns, but had the only role of scouting vessels. As with the second-rate vessels, after Passarowitz the number of ships of this type was slowly diminished and substituted with newly built frigates.

 , 3 ships, 1675-1717 
 , 4 ships, 1684-1697
 , 1 ship, 1684-1695 
 , 2 ships, 1714-1744

Frigates
 Palma-class

Support ships
 Monton d'oro-class, 2 ships, 1688-1695

References

See also
 Venetian navy
 Venetian Arsenal
 Ottoman–Venetian Wars

Sailing
Venetian navy